The Institute is a 2017 American horror thriller film co-directed by Pamela Romanowsky and James Franco. It is based on a true story of a young girl's treatment at The Rosewood Institute in Owings Mills, Maryland, and stars Franco, Allie Gallerani, Tim Blake Nelson, and Lori Singer. The film was released on March 3, 2017.

Synopsis
Baltimore, 1893: young Isabel Porter checks herself into the Rosewood Institute, following the sudden death of her parents, and is subjected to extreme experiments in brainwashing and mind control by the insidious Dr. Cairn.

Cast
James Franco as Dr. Cairn
Allie Gallerani as Isabel Porter
Tim Blake Nelson as Dr. Lemelle
Lori Singer as Madame Werner
Pamela Anderson as Ann Williams
Josh Duhamel as Detective
Eric Roberts as Dr. Torrington
Melissa Bolona as Trudy
Scott Haze as Gunther

Reception
On review aggregator Rotten Tomatoes the film has a score of 0% based on reviews from 6 critics, with an average rating of 2.50/10 rating.

Both RogerEbert.com and Slant Magazine gave the film one star out of four, with the later writing "The Institute seems constantly on the verge of dipping into spoof, though of what exactly is difficult to say".

Gary Goldstein of the Los Angeles Times dismissed the film as 'silly' and added that "the mishmash of a script by Adam and Matt Rager is filled with arch attempts at period dialogue and much psychobabble. Franco and Romanowsky's unsubtle direction doesn’t help."

Matt Donato of Film Journal International also was not impressed with the film, criticizing the script, direction and approach to the material, saying that "watching The Institute, you'll feel caught in a musty chamber with no escape, slowed by wolfsbane serums that beckon the deepest of sleep. No prescription will cure what ails this botched indie experiment".

References

External links

2017 horror thriller films
American independent films
American horror thriller films
Medical-themed films
Films directed by James Franco
2017 independent films
2010s English-language films
2010s American films